Feminist Approaches to Bioethics (International Network on Feminist Approaches to Bioethics), or FAB, is a network of feminists in bioethics, adding feminist perspectives to ethical issues in health care and the biosciences. It publishes a journal, IJFAB: International Journal of Feminist Approaches to Bioethics, and is affiliated with the International Association of Bioethics, with which it meets.

History 
FAB was formed in 1992 at the inaugural meeting of the IAB. Its aims are to create a more inclusive bioethical theory from the viewpoint of disadvantaged groups such as women. It critiques bioethical theory that privileges groups with power.

As IJFAB editor Mary C. Rawlinson writes of the general state of bioethics in the introduction to the journal's inaugural issue,

Co-founding member Anne Donchin writes this on the occasion of FAB's 20th anniversary:

See also 
 Bioethics
 IJFAB: International Journal of Feminist Approaches to Bioethics

External links
 FABnet.org
 Free IJFAB articles online 
 IJFAB Blog
 IJFAB: International Journal of Feminist Approaches to Bioethics
 Section entry in the Stanford Encyclopedia of Philosophy

References 

Organizations established in 1992
Feminist ethics
Bioethics
Ethics organizations